Vula is both a given name and a surname. It may refer to:

Josateki Vula, Fijian politician
Lala Meredith-Vula (born 1966), Kosovan artist and photographer
Samuela Vula (born 1984), Fijian footballer
Vula Malinga (born 1980), American singer
Vula, a 1965 Bulgarian film